True Life Blues: The Songs of Bill Monroe is a compilation album of bluegrass music released through Sugar Hill Records on October 15, 1996. It was a tribute to Bill Monroe. In 1997, the album won Todd Phillips the Grammy Award for Best Bluegrass Album, as the producer.

Track listing
 "Molly and Tenbrooks" – 3:13
 "True Life Blues" – 2:45
 "I'm on My Way to the Old Home" – 2:08
 "Highway of Sorrow" – 2:53
 "Old Ebenezer Scrooge" – 2:46
 "Memories of You" – 3:06
 "Rawhide" – 3:07
 "Can't You Hear Me Callin'" – 4:07
 "Letter from My Darling" – 3:32
 "Sitting Alone in the Moonlight" – 3:16
 "Big Mon" – 3:01
 "Get Down on Your Knees and Pray" – 3:12
 "Used to Be" – 2:03
 "Scotland" – 3:08
 "Travelin' This Lonesome Road" – 3:02
 "Heavy Traffic Ahead 	Bill Monroe" – 2:25
 "Little Cabin Home on the Hill" – 3:49

Personnel

 Joseph Bartoldus – Engineer
 Sam Bush – Mandolin
 Vassar Clements – Fiddle
 Mike Compton – Mandolin
 Donivan Cowart – Engineer
 Gary Denton – Engineer
 Jerry Douglas – Dobro
 Stuart Duncan – Fiddle
 Pat Enright – Guitar, Vocals
 Lester Flatt – Composer
 Greg Garing – Mandolin, Vocals
 Rainer Gembalczk – Mastering
 Richard Greene – Fiddle
 David Grier – Guitar
 David Grisman – Mandolin
 John Hartford – Banjo, Fiddle, Composer, Vocals
 Bradley Hartman – Engineer
 Bobby Hicks – Fiddle
 Steve Horowitz – Engineer
 Kathy Kallick – Guitar, Vocals
 Laurie Lewis – Fiddle, Vocals
 Mike Marshall – Mandolin, Engineer
 Del McCoury – Guitar, Vocals

 Ronnie McCoury – Mandolin, Vocals
 Sue Meyer – Design
 Bill Monroe – Composer, Performer
 Jim Nunally – Guitar, Engineer
 Scott Nygaard – Guitar
 Mollie O'Brien – Vocals
 Tim O'Brien – Guitar, Mandolin, Vocals
 Alan O'Bryant – Vocals
 Herb Pedersen – Banjo, Vocals
 Todd Phillips – Bass, Producer, Engineer, Mixing
 Barry Poss – Executive Producer
 Pete Pyle – Composer
 John Reischman – Mandolin
 Peter Rowan – Guitar, Vocals
 Tom Size – Engineer
 Mark Slagle – Engineer
 Craig Smith – Banjo
 J.B. Smith – Composer
 Chris Thile – Mandolin
 Elizabeth Tormes – Photography
 Tony Trischka – Banjo
 Doc Watson – Composer
 Roland White – Mandolin, Vocals

References

1996 compilation albums
Grammy Award for Best Bluegrass Album
Sugar Hill Records compilation albums
Bill Monroe
Tribute albums